The invitatory (Latin: invitatorium; also invitatory psalm) is the psalm used to start certain daily prayer offices in Catholic and Anglican traditions. Most often it is Psalm 94(95), also known as the Venite. The term derives from Medieval Latin invītātōrium, derived from invītāre, "to invite."

Catholic
The invitatory is used to start Nocturns in the Liturgy of the Hours, the Catholic Church's Divine Office.  It is usually Psalm 94(95), which begins Venite exsultemus in Latin.  After the reform of the Liturgy of the Hours following the Second Vatican Council, the Invitatory is said either before the Office of Readings or Lauds, whichever is said first in a liturgical day. In place of Psalm 94(95), Psalm 99(100), Psalm 66(67), or Psalm 23(24) may be used as circumstances may suggest.

Verse 17 of Psalm 50(51) Domine, labia mea aperies is often used as the invitatory antiphon in the Liturgy of the Hours.

Anglican
In the Episcopal Church, the Morning Prayer office opens with an invitatory psalm, either the Venite (Psalm 95:1-7, or the entire psalm on Ash Wednesday, Holy Saturday, and all Fridays in Lent) or the Jubilate (Psalm 100). An invitatory antiphon may appear before, or before and after the invitatory psalm. The invitatory may be spoken or sung; there are several musical settings in plainsong or Anglican chant.

An invitatory psalm may also be substituted for the Phos Hilaron in Evening Prayer.

In Anglican prayer beads, the invitatory bead is next to the cross, most often corresponding to the opening versicle of Evening Prayer.

Footnotes

References

Liturgy of the Hours
Psalms